207 (two hundred [and] seven) is the natural number following 206 and preceding 208.

In Mathematics 
207 is a Wedderburn-Etherington number. There are exactly 207 different matchstick graphs with eight edges. 207 is also a deficient number, as 207's proper divisors (divisors not including the number itself) only add up to 105:

See also
Peugeot 207
List of highways numbered 207

References

Integers